Poznej svého muže is a 1940 Czechoslovak film. The film starred Josef Kemr.

References

External links
 

1940 films
1940s Czech-language films
Czechoslovak comedy films
1940 comedy films
Czechoslovak black-and-white films
1940s Czech films